Antoniadou is the female version of the Greek surname Antoniadis. Notable people with this name include the following individuals:

Eleni Antoniadou (born 1988), Greek public figure
Praxoula Antoniadou, Cypriot politician

See also

Greek-language surnames
Patronymic surnames